The Edward Manifold Stakes is a Victoria Racing Club Group 2 Thoroughbred horse race for three year old fillies at set weights run over a distance of 1600 metres at Flemington Racecourse in Melbourne, Australia in early October.  Prize money is A$300,000.

History
The race is named after Edward Manifold, the long term committeeman of the Victoria Racing Club and member of many Western District racing clubs in the early years of the 20th century.

Grade
 1932–1978- Principal race
 1979 onwards - Group 2

Distance
 1932–1978 - 1 mile (~1600 metres)
 1979–1992, 1994–95, 2010–11 – 1600 metres
 1993, 1998–99 – 1625 metres
 1996 – 1626 metres
 1997 – 1631 metres
 2000 – 1624 metres
 2001–03, 2007 – 1620 metres
 2004–06, 2008–09, 2012–13 – 1610 metres
 2014 onwards - 1600 metres

Winners

 2022 - She's Licketysplit
 2021 - Elusive Express
 2020 - Thermosphere
 2019 - Moonlight Maid
 2018 - Amphitrite
 2017 - Bring Me Roses
 2016 - Serenely Discreet
 2015 - Badawiya
 2014 - Fontein Ruby
 2013 - Se Sauver
 2012 - Maybe Discreet
 2011 - Mosheen
 2010 - Sistine Angel
 2009 - Majestic Music
 2008 - Gallica
 2007 - El Daana
 2006 - She Will Be Loved
 2005 - Serenade Rose
 2004 - Alinghi
 2003 - Special Harmony
 2002 - Coupe
 2001 - Ugachuka
 2000 - So Gorgeous
 1999 - My Sienna
 1998 - Inaflury
 1997 - Rose Of Danehill
 1996 - Ascorbic
 1995 - Rubidium
 1994 - Love Of Mary
 1993 - Brompton Cross
 1992 - Azzurro
 1991 - Richfield Lady
 1990 - Twiglet
 1989 - French Gypsy
 1988 - Riverina Charm
 1987 - Midnight Fever
 1986 - Society Bay
 1985 - Rebecca Gay
 1984 - Spirit Of Kingston
 1983 - Taj Eclipse
 1982 - Emancipation
 1981 - Darling Take Care
 1980 - Tynia
 1979 - Stage Hit
 1978 - Shannara
 1977 - Princess Talaria
 1976 - Snowmist
 1975 - Better Vain
 1974 - Rainburst
 1973 - Nandalie Lass
 1972 - Sabot
 1971 - Special Draw
 1970 - Dual Choice
 1969 - Gaelic Spirit
 1968 - Snowtop
 1967 - Chosen Lady
 1966 - Storm Queen
 1965 - Gipsy Queen
 1964 - Light Fingers
 1963 - Our Fun
 1962 - Arctic Star
 1961 - Indian Summer
 1960 - Lady Sybil
 1959 - Mintaway
 1958 - Wiggle
 1957 - Goldenway
 1956 - Bendrum
 1955 - Summersette
 1954 - Biff
 1953 - Roslyn
 1952 - Colinga
 1951 - Lady Havers
 1950 - Slick Chick
 1949 - Chicquita
 1948 - Siren Song
 1947 - Perm
 1946 - Joy Stream
 1945 - Norwich
 1944 - Delina
 1943 - Simmering
 1942 - Mermeran
 1941 - Primavera
 1940 - Tranquil Star
 1939 - Border Lass
 1938 - Lady Montague
 1937 - Ena
 1936 - Siren
 1935 - Bimilla
 1934 - Arachne
 1933 - Hap
 1932 - Dutchie

See also
 List of Australian Group races
 Group races

References

Horse races in Australia
Flat horse races for three-year-old fillies
Flemington Racecourse